Sir Alexander Denton (1596 – 1 January 1645) was an English politician who sat in the House of Commons variously between 1625 and 1644. He supported the Royalists during the English Civil War. He also has a house at a grammar school in Buckinghamshire (Royal Latin School)

Early life
Denton was the eldest son of Sir Thomas Denton of Hillesden and his wife Susan Temple, daughter of John Temple of Stowe. He entered Christ Church, Oxford in 1612, was knighted in 1617 and inherited Hillesden manor when he succeeded his father in 1633.

Political career
He entered Parliament in 1624 as the Member of Parliament (MP) for Wendover. In the two parliaments of 1625 Denton was MP for Buckingham.  He was re-elected MP for Buckingham in April 1640 for the Short Parliament and in November 1640 for the Long Parliament. He was appointed High Sheriff of Buckinghamshire for 1637–38.
 
Denton was a Royalist and his house at Hillesden became a focal point during the English Civil War. He was disabled from sitting in Parliament on 22 January 1644.  In January 1644 Parliamentary forces occupied Hillesden House but they were ejected. In early February Colonel William Smith garrisoned Hillesden House with about 260 men to support the King at Oxford. The house was occupied at the time by many of the Denton family and some of the Verney family and Sir Alexander also arrived at the house by chance. A force of over 2000 men under Oliver Cromwell and Samuel Luke laid siege to the house at the beginning of March. After the surrender Smith and Denton were taken prisoner and moved to the Tower of London, while the house was destroyed and the family beggared.

Denton died a prisoner on New Years Day 1645. He was buried at Hillesden on 5 January 1645.

Personal life
Denton had married Mary Hampden, daughter of Edmund Hampden of Hertwell, and a cousin of John Hampden on 3 September 1617. They had five sons and eight daughters. At one time John Kersey the elder was tutor to the sons. The eldest son John Denton was killed at the Battle of Abingdon in 1644.  Only Denton's second son, Edmund, had issue.  Edmund's oldest son Alexander was a Member of Parliament (MP) representing Buckingham, from 1690 to 1698.  Alexander (the grandson) had two sons, Sir Edmund and Alexander who also represented Buckingham. In addition, this Alexander's eldest daughter Elizabeth was the mother of George Chamberlayne Denton, who also represented Buckingham as a Member of Parliament (MP), from 1727 to 1734.  George Chamberlayne Denton was the maternal grandfather of Thomas Coke, 1st Earl of Leicester.

References

 

1596 births
1645 deaths
Alumni of Christ Church, Oxford
Cavaliers
English MPs 1624–1625
English MPs 1625
English MPs 1626
English MPs 1640 (April)
English MPs 1640–1648
Prisoners in the Tower of London
High Sheriffs of Buckinghamshire